is a Japanese actress best known for her work in the Crimson Bat series.

Filmography
 (1958)
 (1965)
 (1965)

 (1969)
 (1969)
 (1969)
 (1970)

References

External links

1937 births
Living people
Japanese actresses
People from Matsuyama, Ehime